Renfrew County Council is the governing body of the upper-tier municipality of Renfrew County in Ontario, Canada. This 17-member body is responsible for the government providing services to a population of 97,000.

Election
Members of council are indirectly elected, as the council is made up the reeves and mayors of the lower-tier municipalities within Renfrew County, including the reeves (rather than mayors) of Arnprior, Deep River, Renfrew, Laurentian Valley and Whitewater Region. The head of County Council is styled as "Warden" and like in all other municipalities in Ontario, has "weak mayor" powers. The Warden is selected by vote of council, and is therefore doubly indirectly elected.

Current council

*Warden of County Council

References

External links
 Official website

County and regional councils in Ontario
Politics of Renfrew County